As of December 2020, the International Union for Conservation of Nature (IUCN) lists 1001 near threatened avian species. Of all evaluated avian species, 9.1% are listed as near threatened. 
No subpopulations of birds have been evaluated by the IUCN.

This is a complete list of near threatened avian species evaluated by the IUCN. Where possible common names for taxa are given while links point to the scientific name used by the IUCN.

Penguins

Procellariiformes

Gruiformes
There are 18 species in the order Gruiformes assessed as near threatened.

Trumpeters
Grey-winged trumpeter
Pale-winged trumpeter

Rallids

Bustards

Parrots
There are 61 parrot species assessed as near threatened.

Cockatoos
Tanimbar corella

Psittacids

Suliformes

Pigeons and doves

Phoenicopteriformes

Pelecaniformes

Galliformes
There are 43 species in the order Galliformes assessed as near threatened.

Cracids

Phasianids

New World quails

Struthioniformes

Bucerotiformes

Accipitriformes

Accipitrids

Anseriformes

Owls

Strigidae

Charadriiformes
There are 51 species in the order Charadriiformes assessed as near threatened.

Sandpipers

Charadriids

Gulls

Other Charadriiformes species

Falconiformes

Coraciiformes
Coraciiformes includes kingfishers and bee-eaters. There are 28 species in the order Coraciiformes assessed as near threatened.

Alcedinidae

Other Coraciiformes species

Passerines
There are 466 passerine species assessed as near threatened.

Vireos

Monarch flycatchers

Finches

Pittas

Formicariids

White-eyes

Cotingas

Thrushes

Starlings

Corvids

Tapaculos

Antbirds

New World warblers

Ovenbirds

Sylviids

Emberizids

Old World babblers

Wrens

Old World flycatchers

Ploceids

Bird-of-paradise species

Bulbuls

Tanagers

Flowerpeckers

Cuckooshrikes

Tyrant flycatchers

Rhipidurids

Cardinals

Sunbirds

Estrildid finches

Other passerine species

Caprimulgiformes
There are 36 species in the order Caprimulgiformes assessed as near threatened.

Frogmouths

Hummingbirds

Nightjars

Swifts

Cuckoos

Trogons

Piciformes
There are 46 species in the order Piciformes assessed as near threatened.

Toucans

Woodpeckers

Megalaimids

Other Piciformes species

Other bird species

See also 
 Lists of IUCN Red List near threatened species
 List of least concern birds
 List of vulnerable birds
 List of endangered birds
 List of critically endangered birds
 List of recently extinct birds
 List of data deficient birds

References 

Bird conservation
Birds
Near threatened birds
Near threatened birds
Birds